Cytochrome b561 is an integral membrane protein responsible for electron transport, binding two heme groups non-covalently. It is a family of ascorbate-dependent oxidoreductase enzymes.

Human proteins containing this domain 
CYB561;    
CYB561D1;  
CYB561D2;  
CYBASC3;   
CYBRD1;

References 

Protein domains
Protein families
Integral membrane proteins